Hollywood Road is a street in Central and Sheung Wan, on Hong Kong Island, Hong Kong. The street runs between Central and Sheung Wan, with Wyndham Street, Arbuthnot Road, Ladder Street, Upper Lascar Row, and Old Bailey Street in the vicinity.

Hollywood Road was the second road to be built when the colony of Hong Kong was founded, after Queen's Road Central. It was the first to be completed. The Man Mo Temple was a place for trial in very early years.

Name
It was probably named by Sir John Francis Davis, the second Governor of Hong Kong, after his family home at Westbury-on-Trym, near Bristol, England. Another origin mentioned for the name is that holly shrubs were growing in the area when the road was constructed. Such plants were not indigenous to the area and would have been imported.

History

Hollywood Road was the second road to be built when the colony of Hong Kong was founded, after Queen's Road Central. It was the first to be completed. Like most major roads in the early years of the colony, Hollywood Road was built by the Royal Engineers. More than 100 years ago, Hollywood Road was rather close to the coastline. In those days, foreign merchants and sailors would put up the antiques and artefacts they "collected" from China for sale here on their way back to Europe. This is how Hollywood Road began its role as an antique market. The 1960 Hollywood film The World of Suzie Wong was shot in part in Hollywood Road. An old wood-built building was re-constructed as a bar for the movie.

There was a Union Church in the street founded in 1844 by the Reverend James Legge, a Scottish missionary who had been sent to Hong Kong in 1843 by the London Missionary Society. The first Union Church was built in 1845 on Hollywood Road above Central. Every Sunday an English language service was held in the morning and a Chinese language service in the afternoon. The Church was later relocated to a new site on Staunton Street.

In the afternoon of December 15, 1941, during the Battle of Hong Kong, a stick Japanese bombs hit the junction of Old Bailey Street and Caine Road, the junction of Pottinger Street and Hollywood Road, Wellington Street and the Central Police Station. The bombing was part of a systematic bombardment of the Hong Kong Island's north shore that was launched on that day.

Features

Hollywood Road is filled with trinket and antique shops of all sorts: from Chinese furniture to porcelain ware, from Buddha sculptures to Tibetan rugs, from Japanese netsukes to Coromandel screens, from Ming dynasty ceramic horsemen and kitsch Maoist memorabilia. Previously known solely for antique shops, Hollywood Road has developed into a contemporary art district in Hong Kong. The first gallery to open was Plum Blossoms in 1987. From then on, many galleries opened in the area.

Man Mo Temple
Man Mo Temple or Man Mo Miu (文武廟) is a common sort of temple for worshipping the Man Tai (文帝), Man Cheong and Mo Tai (武帝), Kwan Tai, to pray for good results in examinations in China. The one on the Hollywood Road was built in 1847. It has been managed by Tung Wah Group of Hospitals since 1908. It is a declared monument.

Central Police Station

Central Police Station was the first police station in Hong Kong. The oldest structure within the compound is a barrack block built in 1864. It is a three-storey building constructed alongside Victoria Prison (see below). A storey was later added to the mass in 1905. In 1919, Headquarters Block facing Hollywood Road was constructed. Subsequently in 1925, the two-storey Stable Block was constructed at the northwest end of the procession ground and later used as a munitions store. The Police Station accompanied by the former Central Magistracy and Victoria Prison form a group of historical architecture representing law and order in Hong Kong.

Other features
Other features along Hollywood Road include:
 Hollywood Road Park
 Liang Yi Museum, a private museum of design, craftsmanship and heritage.
 PMQ, a historic site containing the old Hollywood Road Police Married Quarters, now used as a mixed-use venue for arts and design.

Intersections

See also
 Central–Mid-Levels escalator
 List of streets and roads in Hong Kong
 SoHo

References

China.org.cn. . Retrieved 1 Sep 2007

External links

 

Central, Hong Kong
Sheung Wan
Roads on Hong Kong Island